Earlswood a suburb of Redhill in Surrey, England.

Earlswood may also refer to:

 Earlswood, Monmouthshire, a settlement in Wales
 Earlswood, Warwickshire, a village in both Warwickshire and the West Midlands, England

See also
 Earlswood Lakes
 Royal Earlswood Hospital